The Society of London Theatre (SOLT) is an umbrella organisation for West End theatre in London. Founded in 1908, as Society of West End Theatre Managers, then Society of West End Theatre in 1975, changing to its current name in 1994, the (SOLT) is a not-for-profit organisation which provides a collective voice for the theatre owners, producers and managers of all the major commercial and grant-aided theatres across London. As well as protecting the interests of all its member theatres, SOLT promotes theatregoing through activities including the Laurence Olivier Awards, the TKTS ticket booth, Theatre Tokens, the Official London Theatre fortnightly printed listings guide and the associated OfficialLondonTheatre website. The organisation administers the audience development initiatives Kids Week and Official London Theatre's New Year Sale, and runs events including the 'behind-the-scenes' career fair, TheatreCraft, and West End LIVE, alongside Westminster City Council. SOLT also supports a number of theatrical charities including Stage One and Mousetrap Theatre Projects.

Official London Theatre website and Official London Theatre Guide
Official London Theatre is a website for tickets, news and exclusive interviews for top London shows.

Alongside the website, a printed Official London Theatre Guide is produced fortnightly with show listings and theatre news. The free guide has a distribution of 125,000 and is available to pick up in London theatres and at major tourist outlets across the UK. An Access London Theatre brochure, listing London's range of assisted performances, is also produced four times a year, and is available in print, braille, and on CD.

Olivier Awards

The Olivier Awards (or simply the Olivier's) are presented annually by the Society of London Theatre to recognise excellence in professional theatre. Originally known as the Society of West End Theatre Awards, they were renamed in honour of the British actor Laurence Olivier in 1984.

Awards are presented annually across a range of categories covering plays, musicals, dance, opera and affiliate theatre. The Olivier Awards are recognised internationally as the highest honour in British theatre, equivalent to Broadway's Tony Awards and France's Molière Award. Award winners receive a bronze statuette of Sir Laurence Olivier playing Henry V in 1937. The awards have taken place at various hotels and theatres across London, and since 2012 have been held at the Royal Opera House in Covent Garden.

The first awards ceremony took place in December 1976 at the Café Royal. The winners – who included Alan Howard, Peggy Ashcroft, Penelope Keith and Jonathan Miller – did not receive the iconic bronze statuette; the prize was a specially commissioned blue Wedgwood urn, causing the event to be nicknamed "The Urnies".

Award winners have included the leading names in British theatrical talent, including Laurence Olivier, John Gielgud, Ralph Richardson, Peggy Ashcroft, Joan Plowright, Alec Guinness, Ian McKellen, Judi Dench, Maggie Smith, Derek Jacobi, Eileen Atkins, Ian Holm, Michael Gambon, Helen Mirren, Peter Hall, Joan Littlewood, Alan Ayckbourn, Nicholas Hytner, Harold Pinter, Alan Bennett, Michael Frayn, Ninette de Valois, Gillian Lynne and Andrew Lloyd Webber.

Kids Week

Kids Week is an audience development initiative run annually by SOLT to encourage young people to experience London theatre. Taking place each August, the promotion offers children under 16 the opportunity to see a West End show for free when accompanied by an adult paying full price. Up to two extra children's tickets may also be purchased at half price, and there are no booking or postage fees. A variety of free theatre workshops and activities are also available for participants. The scheme has been highly successful since its conception in 1998, growing from a single week to the entirety of August. In 2012, Kids Week won 'Best Cultural Attraction' at the London Lifestyle Awards.

Official London Theatre's New Year Sale
Official London Theatre's New Year Sale is a discount ticket promotion run by SOLT that takes place annually from January to mid-February. The scheme (initially launched in 2001 as 'Get into London Theatre') offers the public the opportunity to see London shows (including plays, musicals, opera and dance) at £10, £20, £30 or £40.

West End LIVE
West End LIVE is a free event in Trafalgar Square with performances from West End musicals. The annual event is presented by SOLT and Westminster City Council, with support from the Mayor of London, to celebrate and promote London theatre.

Stage One
Stage One is a charity supported by SOLT that seeks to aid the commercial theatre producers of the future. Stage One runs a structured training programme to develop and support new producers which includes workshops, bursaries, start-up funds, internships and investment.

Recipients of Stage One funding have gone on to produce successful productions such as Birdsong (2010), A Doll's House (2013), The Pajama Game (2014) and Avenue Q Tour (2014).

Laurence Olivier Bursary
The Laurence Olivier Bursary was established by the Society in 1987, in honour of the actor's 80th birthday, to support talented students starting their final year of drama school. Such students often face financial difficulties because intense contact hours mean there is little time for students to do paid work. The Society invites about 20 drama schools to each nominate two exceptionally talented students for financial support. About 40 students are entered each June and appear before a panel of theatre industry professionals – usually producers and casting directors – where they give a ten-minute audition (which can include a song) and an interview. SOLT gives several bursaries worth £7,500 each as well as smaller sums (of £1000 plus) at the discretion of the judges. Other organisations contribute their own bursaries in conjunction with the Society's scheme.

References

External links
 
 

West End theatre
Theatre in London
Cultural organisations based in London